Sport Lisboa e Benfica is a Portuguese professional football team based in Lisbon. It was founded as Sport Lisboa on 28 February 1904, following a meeting of former Casa Pia students, led by Cosme Damião, at Farmácia Franco (Franco Pharmacy). Since the club lacked a field to play, it merged with Grupo Sport Benfica on 13 September 1908, thus being renamed Sport Lisboa e Benfica.

Benfica was one of the eight founding members of the Primeira Liga in 1934, and won their first league title in 1935–36, the first of 37 league titles. Moreover, they have won 26 Portuguese Cups, 3 Campeonato de Portugal (the predecessor of the Portuguese Cup), plus a number of other more recently established trophies. Internationally, Benfica have been crowned champions of European football on two occasions, when they won the European Cup in 1961 and 1962.

This page includes a chronological list comprising all those who have held the position of manager of Benfica's first team since its foundation. Each manager's entry includes his dates of tenure and the club's overall competitive record (in terms of matches won, drawn, and lost), honours won and significant achievements while under his care. Caretaker managers are included (when known), as well as those who have been in permanent charge. The club's longest-serving manager is Cosme Damião, who managed the team from 1908 to 1926, totalling 18 years.

Managerial history

Benfica's first manager ever was Manuel Gourlade, an employee at Fármacia Franco and the club's treasury manager. He served for sixteen matches, from the team's first official match on 4 November 1906 until the end of their second season, in 1907–08, when eight players defected to Sporting CP. From then on, Cosme Damião took over and led the club to its first ever Lisbon Championship, in the 1909–10 season. Until the end of the 1910s, he won seven more championships – the last one, in 1920, was particularly hard because of another mass player defection to recently created clubs Os Belenenses and Casa Pia. Facing a much less talented squad and an ever increasing debt related to the construction of football fields, Benfica entered a trophyless period, which led to the departure of Cosme Damião in 1926, after 18 years in charge.

Damião was replaced by Ribeiro dos Reis, a former player of the club who had recently managed the Portugal national team. Despite the slight improvement of Benfica's performances, he failed to win any silverware, ending his spell in 1929 to make way for a foreign manager, Arthur John, who would also double as a masseur for the club's other sports. He was much more successful, leading the club to its first national title, the Championship of Portugal in 1929–30, and retaining it in the next season. Following his move to Sporting in the next season, Benfica reappointed Ribeiro dos Reis for a second spell; nonetheless, he did not fare much better in his second year, adding only a Lisbon Championship, by then a second grade competition. He was succeeded by Vítor Gonçalves in 1934, who would reconquer the Championship of Portugal in his first season and lead the team to their first ever Primeira Liga title in his second tenure.

The managerial changes continued in 1936, with Benfica hiring the first of six Hungarian managers, Lippo Hertzka, who had led Real Madrid to their first La Liga title in 1932. He remained victorious at Benfica, adding two more Primeira Liga titles in three seasons. In 1939, Benfica changed manager again, hiring János Biri. In his first year, he won the club's last Lisbon Championship as well as their first Portuguese Cup. Over the following six seasons, he managed the team in 272 games, winning three Primeira Liga titles and another two Portuguese Cups. With the appearance of Sporting's "five violins" in 1946, Benfica attempted to fight them by sacking Biri at the end of the season and rehiring Hertzka. Under his guidance, Benfica led the 1947–48 league for most of the season; however, they finished in second place, equalised on points with Sporting but with one goal less. Benfica then returned to English managers, hiring Ted Smith in 1948. He guided the team to the Portuguese Cup in his first year, to the league title and to their first international trophy, the Latin Cup, in his second year. He later concluded his two remaining seasons at Benfica with two more Portuguese Cup trophies – although the latter cup was also conquered by his assistant, Cândido Tavares, after Smith's return to England.

For 1952–53, Benfica hired Alberto Zozaya only to be replaced in the middle of the season by Ribeiro dos Reis, whose third spell at the club would lead them to a second place league finish and one Portuguese Cup. Later on, Ribeiro dos Reis led the club halfway through the next year, with José Valdivieso ending their first trophyless season in five years. Benfica then hired Otto Glória, a Brazilian manager that would revolutionise the club by introducing professionalisation. He introduced: a house for the players to focus before matches, and to strengthen discipline; increased wages, allowing professional footballers instead of part-time players; improved physical training; careful supervision of the players' food; regular medical check-ups; an academic program to improve the players' education; the teaching of English language and also, through etiquette, on how to dress and eat.

Statistics
Information correct as of 12 March 2023. Only competitive matches are counted.
Table headers
 Nat. – The coach's nationality is given as his country of birth.
 From – The date the coach began working for Benfica.
 To – The date the coach last worked for Benfica.
 P – The number of games coached for Benfica.
 W – The number of games won as a coach.
 D – The number of games draw as a coach.
 L – The number of games lost as a coach.
 GF – The number of goals scored under his tenure.
 GA – The number of goals conceded under his tenure.
 Win% – The total winning percentage under his tenure.
 Honours – The trophies won while coaching Benfica.

Table key

Notes

References

Bibliography
 
 
 

Managers
 
M
Benfica